Statistics of the Primera Fuerza for the 1918–19 season.

Overview
It was contested by 7 teams, and Club España won the championship.

Iberia de Veracruz from "Liga Veracruzana" changes its name to España Veracruz and joined the league

League standings

Top goalscorers
Players sorted first by goals scored, then by last name.

References

Mexico - List of final tables (RSSSF)

1918-19
Mex
1918–19 in Mexican football